State Road 526 (SR 526) is a   east–west route in the Orlando, Orange County. It runs from State Road 50 in Ocoee, to State Road 15, the frontage roads of State Road 408, in Orlando. After the western terminus of SR 526, State Road 50, it becomes W Washington St. Between US 441 and the western terminus, it is known as County Road 526, and locally known as Old Winter Garden Road. It crosses State Road 408 twice. At the overpass of Interstate 4, State Road 526 runs north–south for 1 block. It then heads into Downtown Orlando via Robinson Street and follows the northern shore of Lake Eola. SR 526 next intersects State Road 15. At the Orlando Executive Airport, it heads north–south and then ends at State Road 15, the frontage roads of State Road 408.

Major intersections

References

External links

Florida Route Log (SR 526)

526
526
526
526